Nop Goliat Dekai Airport  is an airport serving the town of Dekai, the capital of Yahukimo Regency, Highland Papua, Indonesia. Nop Goliat Airport is one of the seven pioneer airports that connects 517 villages in Yahukimo. Construction of the airport Nop Goliath is built on an area of 230 hectares, there have been initiated in the period 2004-2010 by using a budget of Rp 321 billion The airport was built to be a logistics distribution center in the highland region of Papua, as well as supporting the mobility of people and goods. Construction of airports is intended as a logistics distribution center for central highland region of Papua Province, which previously concentrated through Wamena Airport.

After extensive delays, the airport was finally inaugurated by President Joko Widodo (Jokowi) on 18 October 2016. Jokowi personally wants this airports continue to be developed and requested Minister of Transportation Budi Karya Sumadi to extend the runway from 1,950 m to 2,500 meters for the next 2 years. Then, the Ministry of Transportation has allocated Rp 350 billion ($26.8 million) for the expansion, so the expansion runway can serves Boeing 737-200 and Boeing 737-300. It is predicted that the expansion will be finished in 2017.

Currently Nop Goliath airport runway equipped with measuring 1.950 m x 30 m, 2 exit taxiway with a size of 75 m x 23 m each, an apron measuring 320 m x 60 m and equipments as well as other supporting facilities. In the meantime the airport terminal building itself has a n area of 1,900 m2 and can accommodate 300 passengers at peak hours.

Facilities
It has one runway designated 07/25 with an asphalt surface measuring 1,950 m x 30 m (6398 ft × 98 ft).

Airlines and destinations

The following destinations are served from Nop Goliat Dekai Airport:

Incidents and Accidents 
On March 11, 2023, a Trigana Air Boeing 737-500 (PK-YSC) operating IL-221 from Jayapura to Yahukimo was shot at on approach. The aircraft landed safely. The aircraft turned around and was shot at on departure when it flew the return flight to Jayapura, IL-222. A bullet penetrated the aircraft's fuselage and went into seat 7A. A passenger was injured by the shrapnel. The aircaft landed in Jayapura. The Yahukimo police arrested seven people.

References

Airports in Highland Papua